"Wild Man" is a song by Kate Bush released as the lead single from her tenth studio album 50 Words for Snow. It was released as a digital download single in the United Kingdom on 11 October 2011, and peaked at number 73 on the UK Singles Chart. "Wild Man" tells the story of sightings of the Yeti in the wilds of the Himalayas, and of the efforts by the narrator and others to protect him from discovery.

Song information

The song premiered on BBC Radio 2 on Monday 10 October 2011. The 7:16-minute version was first played on The Ken Bruce Show and the 4:16-minute "radio edit" was made available for streaming on Kate Bush's official YouTube channel after the radio premiere. The full-length "Wild Man" was released as a digital download single on 11 October, and it was announced that there would be no CD single. The song was BBC Radio 2's "Record of the Week" for the week starting 16 October.

A 2-minute 33 second "Animation Segment" for "Wild Man" was posted on the Kate Bush official site and on YouTube. The short film was created by Finn and Patrick at Brandt Animation.

In 2015, Bush contributed the track to The Art of Peace − Songs for Tibet II music compilation album, devoted to the 80th birthday of 14th Dalai Lama. Proceeds from the album were used to help preserve and promote the wisdom of the Dalai Lama and Tibetan culture. The song was remixed and retitled as "Wild Man (Remastered Shimmer)".

Track listings
Digital download
 "Wild Man" (Radio Edit) – 4:16 (except in the US)
 "Wild Man" – 7:16

Personnel
Kate Bush – vocals, backing vocals, keyboards
Andy Fairweather Low – vocals
Dan McIntosh – guitar
John Giblin – bass
Steve Gadd – drums

Chart performance

Release history

References

2011 singles
Kate Bush songs
Songs written by Kate Bush
Yeti in fiction
Songs about Tibet
2011 songs